The 1983 European Cup was the 9th edition of the European Cup of athletics. From this edition on, the multiple stages of competition were replaced by the promotion/relegation league system.

The "A" Finals were held at the Crystal Palace National Sports Centre in London, Great Britain.

"A" Final
Held on 20 and 21 August in London, United Kingdom

Team standings

Results summary

Men's events

Women's events

"B" Final
Both "B" finals held on 20 and 21 August

Men
Held in Prague, Czechoslovakia

Women
Held in Sittard, Netherlands

"C" Finals

Men
Both "C" finals held on 20 and 21 August

"C1" Final
Held in Dublin, Ireland

"C2" Final
Held in Lisbon, Portugal

Women
Both "C" finals held on 20 and 21 August

"C1" Final
Held in Dublin, Ireland

"C2" Final
Held in Lisbon, Portugal

References

 European Cup results (Men) from GBR Athletics
 European Cup results (Women) from GBR Athletics

European Cup (athletics)
European Cup
1983 in British sport
International athletics competitions hosted by England
1983 sports events in London
International sports competitions in London
Athletics in London